Road 47 is a road in northwestern Iran. It connects the major city of Isfahan with the city of Arak, the city of Hamedan, and the city of Zanjan. It is located within Hamadan Province, Isfahan Province, Markazi Province, and Zanjan Province.

References

External links 

 Iran road map on Young Journalists Club

47
Transportation in Hamadan Province
Transport in Isfahan
Transportation in Isfahan Province
Transportation in Markazi Province
Transportation in Zanjan Province

Transport in Arak